Henry Zenas Osborne (October 4, 1848 – February 8, 1923) was an American Republican politician who served in the United States House of Representatives from 1917 to 1923.

Biography
He was born in New Lebanon, New York on October 4, 1848. In 1873 he worked for The New York Times. He was elected to the United States House of Representatives from California and served from March 4, 1917, until his death. Osborne died at age 74 in Los Angeles, California. He is interred in Angelus-Rosedale Cemetery.

See also
List of United States Congress members who died in office (1900–49)

References

Further reading

1848 births
1923 deaths
Burials at Angelus-Rosedale Cemetery
People from New Lebanon, New York
Republican Party members of the United States House of Representatives from California